This is a list of Spanish PROMUSICAE Top 20 Singles number-ones of 1996.

Records for the Year

 Longest running number-one of the year - George Michael "Jesus to a Child" (7 non-consecutive weeks)
 Artists with most number ones - George Michael (3)

See also
1996 in music
List of number-one hits (Spain)

References

1996
Spain Singles
Number-one singles